Luzerner Kantonalbank is the cantonal bank and the dominant retail banking group in the Swiss canton of Lucerne, with a market share of 50-60%.  It is main focus on financing small businesses and personal mortgages in the local economy, the bank has avoided some of the issues facing its larger peers in Switzerland and non-performing loans remain at negligible levels.

See also
List of Banks in Switzerland

References

External links
 Official website

Banks of Switzerland
Companies listed on the SIX Swiss Exchange